The IFFI Satyajit Ray Lifetime Achievement Award (formerly IFFI Lifetime Achievement Award) is an international honor instituted by the International Film Festival of India. The recipient is honored for their "outstanding contribution to the growth and development of World cinema.

Background
The award was first instituted in the year 1999 from the 30th IFFI. During the 52nd edition in 2021, on the occasion of the birth centenary of Satyajit Ray, the Directorate of Film Festivals in recognition of the auteur’s legacy, "The IFFI Lifetime Achievement award" was rechristened to "IFFI - Satyajit Ray Lifetime Achievement Award".

Recipients

Satyajit Ray Lifetime Achievement Award (2021–Present)

Erstwhile Lifetime Achievement Award (1999–2020)

References

External links
Official Page for Directorate of Film Festivals, India

Lifetime achievement awards
Lists of Indian award winners
International Film Festival of India
Indian film festivals
Festivals in Goa